The 2011 Cerveza Club Premium Open was a professional tennis tournament played on clay courts. It was the 17th edition of the tournament which was part of the 2011 ATP Challenger Tour. It took place in Quito, Ecuador between 17 and 23 October 2011.

Singles main draw entrants

Seeds

 1 Rankings are as of October 10, 2011.

Other entrants
The following players received wildcards into the singles main draw:
  Joseph Correa
  Eric Nunez
  Walter Valarezo
  Juan-Sebastián Vivanco

The following players received entry from the qualifying draw:
  Nicolás Barrientos
  Juan Sebastián Gómez
  Juan Pablo Ortiz
  Eduardo Struvay

Champions

Singles

 Sebastián Decoud def.  Daniel Muñoz de la Nava, 6–3, 7–6(7–3)

Doubles

 Juan Sebastián Gómez /  Maciek Sykut def.  Andre Begemann /  Izak van der Merwe, 3–6, 7–5, [10–8]

External links
Official Website
ITF Search
ATP official site

 
Cerveza Club Premium Open
Clay court tennis tournaments
Tennis tournaments in Ecuador
Cerveza Club Premium Open
Cerveza Club Premium Open